is a district in Tochigi Prefecture, Japan.

As of 2003, the district has an estimated population of 57,656 and a density of 60.91 persons per square kilometer. Its total area is 946.53 km2.

Towns and villages
Shioya
Takanezawa

History
Named after an old, powerful family that owned most of the area in the district for hundreds of years.

Merger
On March 28, 2005 the towns of Kitsuregawa and Ujiie merged to form the city of Sakura.
On March 20, 2006 the town of Fujihara and the village of Kuriyama merged into the city of Nikkō. With this merger, there are no more villages left within Tochigi Prefecture.

Districts in Tochigi Prefecture